Founded in 2012 by Scott Cross, Sean Cross, Eduardo Sanchez-Navarro Redo, Alfonso Pasquel, Juan Gallardo Thurlow, Eduardo Sanchez-Navarro Rivera Torres, and Pablo Sanchez-Navarro, the Los Cabos International Film Festival is an international film festival that takes place annually in mid-November in Los Cabos, Mexico. The 2012 Los Cabos International Film Festival (formerly Baja International Film Festival) took place November 14–17 in Los Cabos, Mexico. The 2013 Los Cabos International Film Festival took place November 13–16 in Cabo San Lucas, Mexico. The 2014 Los Cabos International Film Festival took place November 12–16, 2014 in Los Cabos, Mexico. The 2015 Los Cabos International Film Festival took place November 11–15, 2015 in Los Cabos, Mexico. The 2016 Los Cabos International Film Festival took place November 9–13, 2016 in Los Cabos, Mexico. The 2017 festival took place November 8–12, 2017 in Los Cabos, Mexico. The 2018 Los Cabos International Film Festival will take place November 7–11, 2018 in Los Cabos, Mexico. Held in one of Mexico's premier resort destinations, the festival draws attendees and filmmakers from across Mexico, the United States, and around the world.

The Los Cabos International Film Festival is overseen by the executive board of Eduardo Sanchez-Navarro Redo, Alfonso Pasquel, Scott Cross, and Sean Cross, and the festival team is led by Executive Director Alejandra Paulin, and Artistic Director Maru Garzon.

The 6th annual Los Cabos International Film Festival drew many leading filmmakers from Mexico, Canada, and the United States, and included Gala film screenings, workshops, pitch sessions, and nightly networking parties. Acclaimed actress Nicole Kidman received the Los Cabos International Film Festival 2018 Outstanding Work in Cinema tribute award.

The 5th annual Los Cabos International Film Festival drew many of the film industry's leading actors, producers, directors, and screenwriters. The festival partnered with Winston Baker to present the Film Finance Summit, with a keynote delivered by IM Global's Stuart Ford, and panelists including Vincent Maraval of Wild Bunch, Phil Hunt of Bankside Films, and producer Gaston Pavlovich, among others. Winston Baker also presented the Visionary Award to prolific producer Alex Garcia. 2016 Festival tribute recipients included Oliver Stone, Monica Bellucci, and Rodrigo Prieto. Special guests included Dennis Quaid, Cary Elwes, Craig Robinson, and Michael Pena.

The 4th annual Los Cabos International Film Festival drew over 17,000 attendees as well as hundreds of industry guests from Mexico, the U.S., and Canada. Festival honorees and special guests included Jean Marc Valee, Jared Leto, Alexander Skarsgaard, Ewan McGregor, and Liam Neeson.

The 3rd annual, 2014 festival, drew over 15,000 attendees. 2014 festival honorees and special guests included Reese Witherspoon, Rosario Dawson, Diego Luna, Atom Egoyan, Denys Arcand, Guillermo Arriaga, Piers Handling, Genna Terranova, and many others.

The 2013 Cabo International Film Festival honored world-renowned Mexican actor Gael Garcia Bernal with a tribute award, as well as multiple award winning director Philippe Falardeau, and one of Mexico's leading film production companies, Mantarraya Films, was also honored.

2012 festival award recipients included 2-time Academy-Award nominated actor Edward Norton, award-winning actor Matt Dillon, Academy-award winning actor Melissa Leo, Academy-award winning actor Octavia Spencer, multiple Emmy winning actor Allison Janney, actor Josh Lucas, and Academy-award nominated director Michael Apted. The 2012 festival drew more than 5,000 attendees and hundreds of filmmakers and film executives, including high-profile celebrities and international media attention. Films screened at the 2012 festival included the Oscar-nominated NO, starring Gael García Bernal and directed by Pablo Larraín. The festival also screened a number of studio films, including Paramount's Rise of the Guardians.

The Los Cabos International Film Festival has established partnerships with the Cannes Film Festival, Tribeca Film Institute, Halifax's Strategic Partners, and Moscow Business Square

See also

 Film festivals in North and Central America

References 

|url= http://www.cabosfilmfestival.com

External links
Los Cabos International Film Festival official website

Film festivals in Mexico
Autumn events in Mexico